David Moss (born 15 November 1968) is an English former footballer, who played for Boston United, Doncaster Rovers, Chesterfield, Scunthorpe United, Partick Thistle, Falkirk, Dunfermline, Ayr United and Swansea City.

Moss ran a car insurance business while playing for Falkirk. Since retiring as a player, Moss has worked as a scout for Swansea City, Crystal Palace and Celtic.

On 1 June 2017, he joined newly promoted Premier League team Huddersfield Town as Head of Football Operations leaves 5 months later, after leaving Celtic.

References

External links 

1968 births
Living people
Footballers from Doncaster
Association football midfielders
English footballers
Boston United F.C. players
Doncaster Rovers F.C. players
Chesterfield F.C. players
Scunthorpe United F.C. players
Partick Thistle F.C. players
Falkirk F.C. players
Dunfermline Athletic F.C. players
Ayr United F.C. players
Swansea City A.F.C. players
Hednesford Town F.C. players
English Football League players
Scottish Football League players
Swansea City A.F.C. non-playing staff
Crystal Palace F.C. non-playing staff
Celtic F.C. non-playing staff